The 8th Women's World Chess Championship took place from 20 December 1949 to 16 January 1950 in Moscow, Russia. The title had been vacant since the death of Vera Menchik in 1944. The round-robin tournament was won by Lyudmila Rudenko. The final results were as follows:

{| class="wikitable"
! !! Player !! 1 !! 2 !! 3 !! 4 !! 5 !! 6 !! 7 !! 8 !! 9 !! 10 !! 11 !! 12 !! 13 !! 14 !! 15 !! 16 !! Points !! Tie break
|- style="background:#ccffcc;"
| style="background:gold;"| 1 ||  || - || 1 || 1 || ½ || ½ || ½ || ½ || 1 || 1 || 1 || 1 || 0 || 1 || 1 || ½ || 1 || 11½ || 
|-
| style="background:silver;"| 2 ||  || 0 || - || 1 || 1 || ½ || ½ || ½ || 0 || ½ || 1 || 1 || 1 || 1 || 1 || 1 || ½ || 10½ || 
|-
| style="background:#cc9966;"| 3 ||  || 0 || 0 || - || ½ || 1 || 1 || 1 || 1 || 0 || 1 || ½ || 1 || ½ || 1 || ½ || 1 || 10 || 68.25
|-
| 4 ||  || ½ || 0 || ½ || - || 1 || 1 || 1 || 0 || 0 || 0 || 1 || 1 || 1 || 1 || 1 || 1 || 10 || 67.75
|-
| 5 ||  || ½ || ½ || 0 || 0 || - || 1 || 0 || 1 || 1 || ½ || 1 || 1 || 0 || 1 || 1 || 1 || 9½ || 62.00
|-
| 6 ||  || ½ || ½ || 0 || 0 || 0 || - || 1 || 1 || 1 || ½ || ½ || 1 || 1 || 1 || ½ || 1 || 9½ || 61.75
|-
| 7 ||  || ½ || ½ || 0 || 0 || 1 || 0 || - || 1 || 0 || ½ || 1 || 1 || 1 || 1 || 1 || 1 || 9½ || 60.00
|-
| 8 ||  || 0 || 1 || 0 || 1 || 0 || 0 || 0 || - || 1 || ½ || ½ || 1 || 1 || ½ || 1 || ½ || 8 || 
|-
| 9 ||  || 0 || ½ || 1 || 1 || 0 || 0 || 1 || 0 || - || 0 || 0 || 0 || ½ || 1 || 1 || 1 || 7 || 
|-
| 10 ||  || 0 || 0 || 0 || 1 || ½ || ½ || ½ || ½ || 1 || - || ½ || 0 || 0 || 0 || 1 || ½ || 6 || 44.25
|-
| 11 ||  || 0 || 0 || ½ || 0 || 0 || ½ || 0 || ½ || 1 || ½ || - || 1 || 1 || 1 || 0 || 0 || 6 || 38.75
|-
| 12 ||  || 1 || 0 || 0 || 0 || 0 || 0 || 0 || 0 || 1 || 1 || 0 || - || 1 || 0 || 0 || 1 || 5 || 32.50
|-
| 13 ||  || 0 || 0 || ½ || 0 || 1 || 0 || 0 || 0 || ½ || 1 || 0 || 0 || - || ½ || 1 || ½ || 5 || 32.50
|-
| 14 ||  || 0 || 0 || 0 || 0 || 0 || 0 || 0 || ½ || 0 || 1 || 0 || 1 || ½ || - || 1 || 1 || 5 || 21.00
|-
| 15 ||  || ½ || 0 || ½ || 0 || 0 || ½ || 0 || 0 || 0 || 0 || 1 || 1 || 0 || 0 || - || 1 || 4½ || 
|-
| 16 ||  || 0 || ½ || 0 || 0 || 0 || 0 || 0 || ½ || 0 || ½ || 1 || 0 || ½ || 0 || 0 || - || 3 || 
|}

References

1949 in chess
1950 in chess
Women's World Chess Championships
Chess Championship
Chess in Russia
1949 in Moscow
1950 in Moscow